Chlum u Třeboně is a market town in Jindřichův Hradec District in the South Bohemian Region of the Czech Republic. It has about 1,900 inhabitants.

Administrative parts
Villages of Lutová, Mirochov and Žíteč are administrative parts of Chlum u Třeboně.

Notable people
Otto Jindra (1886–1932), World War I flying ace
Miroslav Lidinský (born 1972), politician

References

External links

 

Market towns in the Czech Republic
Populated places in Jindřichův Hradec District